Imma Clopés Gasull (born 19 January 1968 in Pedret i Marzà, Catalonia) is a retired heptathlete and pentathlete.

Achievements

Personal bests
200 metres – 25.42 (+2.0 m/s) (Lisbon 1998)
800 metres – 2:20.55 (Tallinn 1997)
100 metres hurdles – 14.14 (+1.5 m/s) (Tallinn 1996)
High jump – 1.82 (Alhama de Murcia 1996)
Long jump – 6.09 (+1.7 m/s) (Alhama de Murcia 1995)
Shot put – 14.12 (Alhama de Murcia 1997)
Javelin throw – 43.12 (Logroño 2000)
Heptathlon – 5843 (Logroño 2000)

External links

1968 births
Living people
Spanish heptathletes
Athletes from Catalonia
Athletes (track and field) at the 1996 Summer Olympics
Athletes (track and field) at the 2000 Summer Olympics
Olympic athletes of Spain
Athletes (track and field) at the 1997 Mediterranean Games
Mediterranean Games competitors for Spain
People from Alt Empordà
Sportspeople from the Province of Girona